Taylor v. Standard Gas and Electric Company, 306 U.S. 307 (1939), was an important United States Supreme Court case in United States corporate law that laid down the "Deep Rock doctrine" as a rule of bankruptcy and corporate law. This holds that claims, as creditors, upon an insolvent subsidiary company by controlling shareholders or other insiders, like managers or directors, will be subordinated to the claims of all other creditors.

Facts
The Deep Rock Oil Corporation was an undercapitalized subsidiary of the defendant Standard Gas Company.

Judgment
The Supreme Court held that, where a subsidiary corporation declares bankruptcy and an insider or controlling shareholder of that subsidiary corporation asserts claims as a creditor against the subsidiary, loans made by the insider to the subsidiary corporation may be deemed to receive the same treatment as shares of stock owned by the insider. 

Therefore, the insider's claims will be subordinated to the claims of all other creditors, i.e. other creditors will be paid first, and if there is nothing left after other creditors are paid then the insider gets nothing. This also applies (and indeed the doctrine was first established) where a parent company asserts such claims against its own subsidiary.

The doctrine will be applied where equity requires, particularly where the subsidiary was undercapitalized at the time that it was established, and can thereby be shown to have been mismanaged for the parent corporation's benefit.

See also
US corporate law

External links
 

United States bankruptcy case law
United States corporate case law
United States securities case law
United States Supreme Court cases
United States Supreme Court cases of the Hughes Court
1939 in United States case law